Thomas Leahy (22 January 1907 – 29 December 1978) was an Irish hurler who played as a centre-forward for the Kilkenny senior team from 1932 until 1937.

Leahy made his first appearance for the team during the 1932 championship and became a regular player over the next decade. During that time he won three All-Ireland winner's medal, five Leinster winner's medals and a National Hurling League winners' medal.

At club level Leahy enjoyed a lengthy career with the Emeralds club, however, he failed to win a county club championship winners' medal.

Leahy's brother, Terry, was also an All-Ireland medal-winner with Kilkenny. His brother-in-law, John Joe Cassidy won All-Ireland medals with the Cavan senior football team.

References

1907 births
1978 deaths
Emeralds hurlers
Kilkenny inter-county hurlers
All-Ireland Senior Hurling Championship winners